Newton Heath TMD is a traction maintenance depot in Newton Heath, Manchester, England, at the junction of the Calder Valley Line and the former Oldham Loop Line  east of Manchester Victoria station.

History
In 1987, the depot's allocation of rolling stock included Classes 101, 104, 108, 142 and 150/2 DMUs. Although, Classes 08, 31, 45 and 47 could also usually be seen at the depot. By 1994, the depot's allocation included Classes 142, 150/1, 150/2, 153 and 156.

Allocation 

Northern Trains , and  Sprinters and  Civity trains are allocated here.

References

Sources

Further reading

Other media

Railway depots in England
Buildings and structures in Manchester
Rail transport in Greater Manchester